Antikuna (Quechua for metals or minerals or the inhabitants of the rainforest, also spelled Anticona) is a mountain in the Andes of Peru which reaches a height of approximately . It is located in the Junín Region, Jauja Province, Apata District. Antikuna lies south of Utkhulasu and T'uruqucha.

References 

Mountains of Peru
Mountains of Junín Region